MSA or M.S.A. may refer to:

Organizations and businesses

Public services and agencies
 China Maritime Safety Administration, a PRC Coast Guard
 Maritime Safety Agency, now the Japan Coast Guard
 Indonesian Maritime Security Agency
 Pakistan Maritime Security Agency
 Mutual Security Agency, established by the U.S. Mutual Security Act (1951), and distributed aid to Europe after the Marshall Plan

Academic
 Metaphysical Society of America, a society promoting the study of philosophy and metaphysics
 Microscopy Society of America, a society for the promotion of microscopy
 Mineralogical Society of America, an organization for the advancement of mineralogy
 Mycological Society of America, a society promoting the study of fungi

Commercial
 Malaysia–Singapore Airlines, the former name for Singapore Airlines and Malaysia Airlines
 Masonic Service Association, a Freemasonry publishing resource
 Master service agreement, a master agreement defining services to be delivered
 Mine Safety Appliances, a manufacturer of industrial safety clothing and equipment
 ICAO code for Poste Air Cargo

Other
 Maine Snowmobile Association, the snowmobile association of Maine
 Motor Sports Association, the governing body for motorsport in the United Kingdom
 Mad Science Alliance, a fictional organization in and the working title of the 2008 role-playing game Monster Lab

Education

Degrees
 Master of Advanced Studies in Sports Administration, a sports management degree
 Master of Accountancy, an accounting degree
 Master of Science in Administration, a degree providing preparation for administrative positions

Schools & Societies
 Mackintosh School of Architecture, an architecture school in Glasgow, Scotland
 Manchester School of Architecture, an architecture school in Manchester, England
 Middle States Association of Colleges and Schools, an evaluation and accreditation association 
 Minnesota Math and Science Academy, a school in Minnesota
 Mississippi School of the Arts, a high school in Brookhaven, Mississippi
 Missouri Scholars Academy, a summer program at the University of Missouri
 Montessori School of Anderson, a private school in Anderson, South Carolina
 MSA Mutfak Sanatlari Akademisi, a culinary arts institute in Istanbul, Turkey
 Modern Sciences and Arts University, a university in October City, Egypt
 Monash Student Association, the student government association of Monash University, Melbourne, Australia
 Muslim Students' Association, a group dedicated to Islamic societies on college campuses in Canada and the United States

Science and medicine
 5-Methoxysalicylic acid, a chemical compound used as a matrix in MALDI mass spectrometry
 Mannitol salt agar, an agar used in microbiology
 Measurement systems analysis, the analysis of the process of obtaining measurements
 Methanesulfonic acid, an organic sulfonic acid
 Middle Stone Age, a period of African prehistory
 Multiple sequence alignment, an alignment of three or more biological sequences
 Multiple system atrophy, a degenerative neurological disorder
 Multiscale approximation or multiresolution analysis
 Morphosyntactic alignment (linguistics)

Technology
 Message submission agent, a computer program used when sending email
 Microsoft Access, a database management system
 Microsoft Account, a single sign-on web service
 Mobile Service Architecture, a combination of Java ME extensions
 Multi-source agreement, an agreement between multiple manufacturers to make products which are compatible across vendors
 Measurement systems analysis, in quality management a specially designed experiment that seeks to identify the components of variation in the measurement
 Microservice architecture, Considered by some as a variant of the service-oriented architecture (SOA), it is a method of developing software applications as a suite of independently deployable, small, modular services

Transportation
 MSA Garratt, a steam engine class of the Western Australian Government Railways
 Minimum safe altitude, used for safely navigating aircraft over terrain or large structures
 Motorway service area, a public rest area
 Muskrat Dam Airport, an airport at Muskrat Dam, Ontario, Canada (IATA code)

Other uses
 Magnuson-Stevens Act, common alternate abbreviation of 1976 Magnuson–Stevens Fishery Conservation and Management Act (MSFCMA)
 Mainland Southeast Asia linguistic area, a sprachbund in Southeast Asia
 Malay language, in the ISO 639-2 and ISO 639-3 language code
 Mapping Services Agreement, a licensing contract between local authorities in the United Kingdom and suppliers of geographic data 
 Matthew Shepard Act, 2009 United States federal hate-crime legislation
 Market Square Arena, an indoor arena in Indianapolis, Indiana, demolished in 2001
 Medical savings account, a tax-deferred deposit account for medical expenses
 Meritorious Service Award, an award of the Civil Air Patrol in the United States
 Metropolitan Statistical Area, a geographical area associated with an urban area of 50,000 people or more, as defined by the United States Office of Management and Budget
 Micropolitan Statistical Area, a geographical area associated with an urban area of 10,000 to 49,999 people, as defined by the United States Office of Management and Budget
 Modern Standard Arabic, also known as Literary Arabic, the standard and literary variety of Arabic used in writing and in most formal speech
 Tobacco Master Settlement Agreement, an agreement reached between U.S. states and major tobacco companies
 MSA Kyotei, a Japanese abbreviation in reference to U.S. and Japan Mutual Defense Assistance Agreement